Van Biesbroeck may refer to:

People with the surname Van Biesbroeck

 George Van Biesbroeck (1880-1974) - astronomer
 Jules Evarist Van Biesbroeck (1848-1920)- artist 
 Jules Pierre Van Biesbroeck (1873-1965) - artist
 Marguerite Van Biesbroeck (1875-1965) - artist

Other:

 1781 Van Biesbroeck, a main-belt asteroid
 George Van Biesbroeck Prize
 Mount Van Biesbroeck, near the McDonald Observatory
 Van Biesbroeck, a lunar crater
 Van Biesbroeck's star (VB 10), a red dwarf